The 2008–09 Texas A&M Aggies men's basketball team represents Texas A&M University in the 2008–09 NCAA Division I men's basketball season. The team is led by second-year head coach Mark Turgeon, who coached the team to a 25–11 record and an NCAA tournament appearance in his first season.

The Aggies went 14–1 in nonconference play, with wins over Alabama, Arizona, and LSU; the one loss was handed by Tulsa.

Leading into the season
Josh Carter and Bryan Davis received preseason Big 12 honorable mention. The team did not make the top 25 of the preseason AP or Coaches polls, though received votes.

During the 2009 signing period, the Aggies signed Naji Hibbert, Khris Middleton, Kourtney Roberson, and Ray Turner, who are all listed in the Rivals.com Top 150 prospects for the class of 2009. Hibbert, a Rivals four-star, is the highest-ranked recruit at No. 88. The recruiting class placed 23rd in the Rivals' early signing period national rankings compiled on 12 November 2008. ESPN's recruiting services ranked the class 25th in November as well.

2008 recruiting class

Roster

Season accomplishments
In the Florida A&M game, the team set a Big 12 game record after shooting all 20 of its free throws. Chinemelu Elonu recorded six blocked shots, the third most in school history. Donald Sloan also scored a season-high of 21 points.
Three players—Chinemelu Elonu, Bryson Graham, and Nathan Walkup—made the season's Academic All-Big 12 team. Elonu made the first team (GPA of 3.20+) while Graham and Walkup made the second team (GPA of 3.00–3.19).
Josh Carter became an All-Big 12 Third Team selection, while Derrick Roland was selected to the Big 12 All-Defensive Team.

Schedule

|-
!colspan=9| Exhibition

|-
!colspan=9| Regular season

|-
!colspan=9| Big 12 Tournament

|-
!colspan=9| NCAA Tournament

References

Texas A&M Aggies men's basketball seasons
Texas AandM
Texas AandM